Villa Parke is a neighborhood in Pasadena, California, bordered by Mountain Street to the north, Interstate 210 to the south, Fair Oaks Avenue to the west, and Los Robles Avenue to the east.

Landmarks
At the district's southern edge is the iconic brick clock tower at St. Andrew's Church. At the neighborhood's center is the Villa Parke Recreation Center. There is significant commercial development on Fair Oaks Avenue and Orange Grove Boulevard.

Sports
Villa Parke has its own soccer league;The Villa Parke Soccer League.  There are various divisions such as Women's division, Mascotas division(Little kids), Teens division, and Adult division.  Various game fields include Villa Parke field, Brookside field, Victory Park field, the    Rose Bowl, and other parks in the Pasadena/Altadena area. Sometimes they also use schools like John Muir and others.

Education
Villa Parke is served by Madison and Washington Elementary Schools, Octavia Butler Middle School, and John Muir High School.

Transportation
Villa Parke is served by Metro Local lines 256, 660 and 662. It is also served by Pasadena Transit routes 20, 40, 51, and 52.

Neighborhoods in Pasadena, California